Sahariyar Ahmed Afnan (بيداء أفنان) is a former Adviser to the Iraqi Permanent Mission at the United Nations. She represented Iraq in the United Nations General Assembly's Third Committee (Social, Cultural, and Humanitarian) and on the Commission on the Status of Women. In this role, she was "one of the delegates most directly responsible" for the inclusion of the International Covenant on Civil and Political Rights' Article 3 (Part I) which guarantees "the equal right of men and women to the enjoyment of all civil and political rights" enshrined therein.

In the 1950s, she served as the press attache for the Embassy of Iraq in Washington, D.C., and maintained a friendly relationship with Eleanor Roosevelt.

References

Year of birth missing (living people)
Iraqi women diplomats
Iraqi feminists
Iraqi diplomats
Living people